The Municipio Gran Sabana is one of the 11 municipalities (municipios) that makes up the Venezuelan state of Bolívar and, according to the 2011 census by the National Institute of Statistics of Venezuela, the municipality has a population of 28,450. The town of Santa Elena de Uairén is the shire town of the Gran Sabana Municipality.

Demographics
The Gran Sabana Municipality, according to a 2007 population estimate by the National Institute of Statistics of Venezuela, has a population of 34,095 (up from 27,027 in 2000). This amounts to 2.2% of the state's population. As of 2011, the Gran Sabana Municipality has amongst the highest proportion of indigenous people in the country, roughly 77.67%, the majority of which being Pemon.

Government
The mayor of the Gran Sabana Municipality is Emilio González, elected in the 2017 Venezuelan municipal elections.  He replaced Manuel Vallés shortly after the elections.  The municipality is divided into one (two if you count the Capital Gran Sabana section) parish (Ikabarú).

See also
Gran Sabana
Santa Elena de Uairén
Bolívar
Municipalities of Venezuela

References

External links
gransabana-bolivar.gob.ve  

Gran Sabana